The International Journal of Green Economics or IJGE is a quarterly peer-reviewed academic journal covering green economics. It was established in 2006 and is published by Inderscience Publishers on behalf of the Green Economics Institute. The editor-in-chief is Miriam Kennet.

Abstracting and indexing 
The journal is abstracted and indexed in:

References

External links 
 

Economics journals
English-language journals
Publications established in 2006
Quarterly journals
Inderscience Publishers academic journals